Judy Rae Mosley-McAfee (March 17, 1968 – September  16, 2013) was a professional basketball player. She played a season for the Sacramento Monarchs.

University of Hawaii
Mosley-McAfee was a two-time All-American at UH in 1989 and 1990. She is the only player in school history to lead the Rainbow Wahine in scoring and rebounding for four consecutive seasons. She is the school's all-time leader in points (2,479) and rebounds (1,441), averaging 21.7 PPG and 12.6 RPG. She also scored 30 or more points in a game 19 times.

Career statistics

College
Source

WNBA

Regular season
Source

|-
| 1997 || Sacramento || 13 || 9 || 20.4 || .440 || – || 1.000 || 3.6 || .8 || .6 || .2 || 1.8 || 4.2

International career
In 1990, Mosley-McAfee won a gold medal at World University Games.

Personal life
Mosley-McAfee had a husband (Marvin McAfee) and four children (Audreyanah, Jor-El, Aryanah, Jabari).

Mosley-McAfee died on September 16, 2013, after a three-year battle with cancer.

References

1968 births
2013 deaths
African-American basketball players
American women's basketball players
Forwards (basketball)
Hawaii Rainbow Wahine basketball players
Sacramento Monarchs players
Basketball players from Los Angeles
20th-century African-American sportspeople
21st-century African-American people
20th-century African-American women
20th-century African-American people
21st-century African-American women